This is a list of maritime explorers. The list includes explorers which had contributed, and continue to contribute to human knowledge of the planet's geography, weather, biodiversity, human cultures, the expansion of trade, or established communication between diverse populations...

Ocean explorers

See also

Explorer
Polar explorer
List of Italian explorers
List of Russian explorers
Timeline of maritime migration and exploration

References and notes

Explorers, sea
Sea explorers